Orthogynium is a monotypic genus of flowering plants belonging to the family Menispermaceae. The only species is Orthogynium gomphloides.

Its native range is Madagascar.

References

Menispermaceae
Menispermaceae genera
Monotypic Ranunculales genera